Dole Station is a railway station on the Riga–Daugavpils Railway.

References 

Railway stations in Latvia
Railway stations opened in 1884